Pablo Sebastián Rodríguez Carbajal, known as Pablo Rodríguez (born 23 August 1979 in Montevideo) is an Uruguayan professional football player. He played in Uruguay for Nacional, Tacuarembó F.C., Boston River, Miramar Misiones; and in Guatemala for Deportivo Mictlán and Universidad SC.

References

1979 births
Living people
Footballers from Montevideo
Uruguayan footballers
Association football defenders
Club Nacional de Football players
Tacuarembó F.C. players
Uruguayan Primera División players